Association Sportive Mirebalais (commonly referred to as AS Mirebalais) is a professional football club based in Mirebalais, Haiti.

History
Association Sportive Mirebalais is a result of a merger of all clubs from Mirebalais in 2000.

References

Football clubs in Haiti
Association football clubs established in 2000